Paragongylopus is a genus of stick insects in the tribe Gratidiini, erected by S.C. Chen and Y.H. He in 1997.  Species have been recorded from China, Thailand and Vietnam (possibly incomplete distribution).

Species
The Phasmida Species File lists:
subgenus Paragongylopus Chen & He, 1997
 Paragongylopus brevicornis Ho, 2019
 Paragongylopus cheni Ho, 2017
 Paragongylopus sinensis Chen & He, 1997 - type species (P. sinensis sinensis: 2 subspp.)
subgenus Planoparagongylopus Ho, 2017
 Paragongylopus abramovi Ho, 2017
 Paragongylopus lii Ho, 2017
 Paragongylopus nabanheensis Ho, 2017
 Paragongylopus obtusidentatus Ho, 2019
 Paragongylopus plaumanni Zompro, 2000

References

External links

Phasmatodea genera
Phasmatodea of Asia
Gratidiini